Purificación Angue Ondo is a diplomat from Equatorial Guinea, and the country's ambassador to the United States. She has had a "pivotal role in promoting the status of women within and beyond the frontiers of her country".

Career
Angue Ondo trained as a teacher, and started working as teacher in 1964. By 1968, she had left teaching and was working at the Ministry of Foreign Affairs, when she was arrested, the first of several arrests over the next five years, for reasons she is not entirely sure of.

Under President Francisco Macías Nguema, she was detained on several occasions, and eventually fled to neighbouring Gabon, where she lived in exile from 1973 to 1980, teaching Spanish at a school there.

In 1981, she was appointed as Deputy Minister of Labour, Social Security and Women's Promotion. In the 1990s, Angue Onde worked in Equatorial Guinea's Ministry for the Promotion of Women before going on to serve as Ambassador to Cameroon and since 2005, Ambassador to the United States.

Personal life
Angue Ondo is a single parent and the mother of six children.

References

Year of birth missing (living people)
Living people
Equatoguinean women diplomats
Government ministers of Equatorial Guinea
Ambassadors of Equatorial Guinea to the United States
Ambassadors of Equatorial Guinea to Cameroon
Women ambassadors
African feminists
Women government ministers of Equatorial Guinea